Baía da Santana (Portuguese meaning Saint Anne's bay) is a bay on the northwest coast of the island of Maio in Cape Verde. The nearest village is Morrinho, about 2 km to the south.

References

Bays of Cape Verde
Santana